Męczyn-Kolonia  is a village in the administrative district of Gmina Mokobody, within Siedlce County, Masovian Voivodeship, in east-central Poland.

References

Villages in Siedlce County